Dominick Vincent Daniels (October 18, 1908 – July 17, 1987) was an American Democratic Party politician who represented New Jersey's 14th congressional district from 1959 to 1977.

Early life and education
He was born in Jersey City, New Jersey on October 18, 1908. Daniels was educated in the Jersey City Public Schools, graduating from William L. Dickinson High School in 1925.

He attended Fordham University, New York City.
He graduated from Rutgers University Law School in Newark, New Jersey, in 1929. He was admitted to the bar in New Jersey in 1930 and commenced the practice of law in Jersey City, New Jersey.

Political career
He was appointed magistrate of the Jersey City Municipal Court in May 1952, reappointed in 1955, and subsequently was appointed presiding magistrate, in which capacity he served until March 1958.
He served as delegate, Democratic National Conventions, 1960, 1964 and 1968.

Daniels was elected as a Democrat to the Eighty-sixth and to the eight succeeding Congresses (January 3, 1959 – January 3, 1977). He was not a candidate for reelection in 1976 to the Ninety-fifth Congress.

Later life
Daniels returned to the practice of law in Jersey City after leaving Congress. He lived in Union City, New Jersey until his death in Jersey City on July 17, 1987. He was interred in Holy Cross Cemetery in North Arlington, New Jersey.

Legacy
The USPS Processing and Distribution Center on Newark Turnpike in Kearny, New Jersey is named in his honor.  His name is included in the postmark on envelopes processed there.

References

External links
Image at the Library of Congress

1908 births
1987 deaths
New Jersey state court judges
William L. Dickinson High School alumni
Fordham University alumni
Rutgers School of Law–Newark alumni
Politicians from Jersey City, New Jersey
Democratic Party members of the United States House of Representatives from New Jersey
Politicians from Union City, New Jersey
20th-century American lawyers
Burials at Holy Cross Cemetery (North Arlington, New Jersey)
20th-century American politicians
20th-century American judges